Meramec Valley R-III School District is a school district serving portions of Franklin County, Jefferson County, and St. Louis County.

Schools

Pre-K
 Doris Hoffman Early Learning Center

Elementary schools
 Coleman Elementary School
 Nike Elementary School
 Robertsville Elementary School
 Truman Elementary School
 Zitzman Elementary School

Middle schools
 Pacific Intermediate
 Riverbend Middle School

High schools
 Pacific High School

References

School districts in Missouri
Education in Franklin County, Missouri
Education in St. Louis County, Missouri